The ZIS-115 is a Soviet built armored version of the ZIS-110 limousine, designed and built especially for Joseph Stalin. 32 of the cars were manufactured between 1948-49. The heavily armored car's design was based on the American 1942 Packard Super Eight.
Stalin, extremely paranoid of assassination, always rode in the rear of the car, seated between two armed bodyguards.
He never rode in the same armored ZIS two days in a row, and frequently changed the route driven from his home in Kuntsevo to the Kremlin. After Stalin's death in 1953, the armored ZIS limousines continued to be used for many years by successive Soviet leaders. Today, several of the cars still exist and are owned by private collectors and museums around the world.  
 

Cars of Russia
1940s cars
1950s cars
115
Soviet automobiles